Ila Bhattacharya (1921-2010) was an Indian politician. She was a Member of Parliament, representing Tripura in the Rajya Sabha, the upper house of India's Parliament, as a member of the Communist Party of India (Marxist). Her parents Jatindra Mohan Bandhopadhyaya and Saraju Bala originally belonged to the Madharipur village in  Faridpur District.

References

Rajya Sabha members from Tripura
Communist Party of India (Marxist) politicians
Women in Tripura politics
Tripura politicians
Women members of the Rajya Sabha
People from Dibrugarh district
1921 births
2010 deaths